Kenji Morimoto (born 14 December 1975) is a Japanese equestrian. He competed in two events at the 1996 Summer Olympics.

References

1975 births
Living people
Japanese male equestrians
Olympic equestrians of Japan
Equestrians at the 1996 Summer Olympics
Place of birth missing (living people)
Asian Games medalists in equestrian
Equestrians at the 2002 Asian Games
Asian Games gold medalists for Japan
Medalists at the 2002 Asian Games